Souleymane Sylla, is a Guinean-born Italian actor and filmmaker. He is best known for his roles in the films Les princes de la ville, Shiny Happy People and Tolo Tolo.

Personal life
He was born in Guinea and later moved to Italy.

Career

Souleymane Sylla was born in Senegal where he spent his early childhood. He was 8 years old when the family moved to Créteil. It was at the Simone de Beauvoir high school that he discovered theater. Later on he was admitted to the highly selective and prestigious French National Theatre Conservatory.
He participated in the opening up of diversity in the theater, notably at the TNS in Strasbourg. Spotted by the director Blandine Savetier, he was hired for the Odyssey serial project, presented in 13 episodes, outdoors, during the 2019 Avignon Festival.
From 2013, we see him in several short films, including Anthropology of a modern man, Regulation of a tale and Cutting the veil, in which he plays major roles.
He moved to directing in 2012 with Mchinda, l'invaincu, followed in 2015 by Le Costume and Les Princes de la ville in 2016.
As the leading role, he performed in Germany for the TV movie Penthesilea by Maximilian Villwock 
In 2019, he appeared in Jérémie Elkaïm's film, Ils sont vivants, which was not released in France until two years later due to the Covid-19 pandemic.
In 2020, he starred in the Italian comedy film Tolo Tolo with the role 'Oumar'.[4] The film became a blockbuster with a record breaking first day gross of €8.7 million.

Filmography

References

External links
 

Living people
Italian film actors
21st-century Italian male actors
Guinean emigrants to Italy
Italian film directors
Guinean film directors
Guinean actors
Year of birth missing (living people)